The clerk, chief clerk, secretary, or secretary general of a legislative chamber is the senior administrative officer responsible for ensuring that its business runs smoothly. This may encompass keeping custody of documents lain before the house, received, or produced; making records of proceedings; allocating office space; enrolling of members, and administering an oath of office. During the first sitting of a newly elected legislature, or when the current presiding officer steps down, they may act as the presiding officer in the election of a new presiding officer such as the speaker or president. The clerk in some cases has a ceremonial role. A clerk may also advise the speaker or members on parliamentary procedure, acting in American parlance as a "parliamentarian".

In the Westminster system, the clerk is usually an apolitical civil servant, and typically attains the position through promotion and retains it until retirement.

In the United States, while clerks are usually nonpartisan, they are often elected by the assembly members at the beginning of each term. At the federal level, and typically at state level, the lower house has a "(chief) clerk" while the upper house has a "secretary".

See also
 Serjeant-at-arms

External links
 American Society of Legislative Clerks & Secretaries (ASLCS) National Conference of State Legislatures
 Society of Clerks-at-the-Table in Commonwealth Parliaments
 The UK Parliamentary Archives holds the records of the Society of Clerks-at-the-Table

 
Civil services